Vatica oblongifolia is a tree in the family Dipterocarpaceae, native to Borneo. The specific epithet oblongifolia means "rather long leaf".

Description
The inflorescences bear cream-coloured flowers. The timber is used in furniture and construction.

Distribution and habitat
Vatica oblongifolia is endemic to Borneo.

References

oblongifolia
Endemic flora of Borneo
Plants described in 1860
Taxa named by Joseph Dalton Hooker